The Buster is a 1923 American silent Western film directed by Colin Campbell and written by Jack Strumwasser. It is based on the 1920 novel The Buster by William Patterson White. The film stars Dustin Farnum, Doris Pawn, Francis McDonald, Gilbert Holmes and Lucille Hutton. The film was released on February 18, 1923, by Fox Film Corporation.

Cast       
 Dustin Farnum as Bill Coryell
 Doris Pawn as Charlotte Rowland
 Francis McDonald as Swing
 Gilbert Holmes as Light Laurie
 Lucille Hutton as Yvonne

References

External links
 

1923 films
1923 Western (genre) films
Fox Film films
Films directed by Colin Campbell
American black-and-white films
Silent American Western (genre) films
1920s English-language films
1920s American films